The 1879 Maine gubernatorial election was held on September 8, 1879. Republican nominee Daniel F. Davis defeated Greenback nominee Joseph L. Smith and incumbent Governor Alonzo Garcelon. This election saw the continued rise of the newly popular Greenback party, it was an American political party with an anti-monopoly ideology which was active between 1874 and 1889.

General election

Candidates

Republican 

 Daniel F. Davis

Greenback 

 Joseph L. Smith

Democratic 

 Alonzo Garcelon

Results

References 

Maine
Maine gubernatorial elections
Gubernatorial